The Key is a 1987 Iranian drama film directed by Ebrahim Forouzesh and written by Abbas Kiarostami.

See also
List of Iranian films

External links

1987 films
1987 drama films
1980s Persian-language films
Films set in Iran
Abbas Kiarostami
Iranian drama films